Atsepar, also spelled Otsepor is a former Yurok settlement in Humboldt County, California. Kroeber maps it on the Klamath River south of the confluence of Bluff Creek and the Klamath, but above the confluence with the Trinity River; its precise location is unknown.

References

Former settlements in Humboldt County, California
Former Native American populated places in California